Bryan Akipa (Sisseton Wahpeton Oyate) is a Dakota flautist with five solo albums to date.

He has been a featured artist at A Prairie Awakening, an annual event held at the Kuehn Conservation Area near Earlham, Iowa. He is a member of the Sisseton Wahpeton Oyate. He attended the Institute of American Indian Arts. He also studied fine arts with painter Oscar Howe at the University of South Dakota at Vermillion.

Awards
"His CDs have been nominated for several Nammies (Native American Music Awards), including 1998 honors for The Flute Player album, 1999 Thunder Flute (also the Indie awards finalist), 2001 Eagle Dreams, and in 2002 Best Flutist, Best Male Artist. He was a featured player on My Relatives Say by Mary Louise Defender, which won the 2000 NAMA for Best Spoken Word recording."

Akipa was awarded a National Heritage Fellowship by the National Endowment for the Arts in 2016.

Discography

As contributor

References

External links
 
 
 

Living people
Native American flautists
Year of birth missing (living people)
National Heritage Fellowship winners
20th-century American musicians
20th-century American male musicians
21st-century American musicians
21st-century American male musicians
Sisseton Wahpeton Oyate people
Institute of American Indian Arts alumni
University of South Dakota alumni
20th-century flautists
21st-century flautists